Mark Andrew Capes (born 19 February 1954) is a British diplomat who served as the Governor of Saint Helena, Ascension and Tristan da Cunha from 2011 to 2016. He was replaced by Lisa Phillips.  His previous roles have included diplomatic appointments in Austria, Nigeria, Portugal, Jordan, Yugoslavia, the Turks and Caicos Islands and New Zealand, and appointments as deputy governor in Anguilla and Bermuda.

Capes is married to Tamara Capes and has two daughters.

References 

British diplomats
Deputy Governors of Anguilla
Deputy Governors of Bermuda
Governors of Saint Helena
British colonial governors and administrators in the Americas
British colonial governors and administrators in Africa
Living people
1954 births